Clarence Lee may refer to:

 Clarence Lee (cricketer) (1890–1959), Australian cricketer
 Clarence Lee (make-up artist) (born 1973), Singaporean professional make-up artist